"O Menino está dormindo" is a Portuguese traditional Christmas carol from the city of Évora. The original lyricist and the composer are unknown.

It is dated by Mário de Sampayo Ribeiro to the late 18th or early 19th century.

Lyrics

See also
List of Christmas carols

References

Menino está dormindo
Menino está dormindo
18th-century hymns
19th-century songs
Year of song unknown